The second question of the 1967 Australian referendum of 27 May 1967, called by the Holt Government, related to Indigenous Australians. Voters were asked whether to give the Federal Government the power to make special laws for Indigenous Australians in states, and whether in population counts for constitutional purposes to include all Indigenous Australians. The term "the Aboriginal Race" was used in the question.

Technically the referendum question was a vote on the Constitution Alteration (Aboriginals) Bill 1967 that would amend section 51(xxvi) and repeal section 127.

The amendments to the Constitution were overwhelmingly endorsed, winning 90.77% of votes cast and having majority support in all six states. The Bill became an Act of Parliament on 10 August 1967.

Background
In 1901, the Attorney-General Alfred Deakin provided a legal opinion on the meaning of section 127 of the Constitution. Section 127 excluded "aboriginal natives" from being counted when reckoning the numbers of the people of the Commonwealth or a state. His legal advice was that "half-castes" were not "aboriginal natives".

Prior to 1967, censuses asked a question about Aboriginal race to establish numbers of "half-castes" and "full-bloods". "Full-bloods" were then subtracted from the official population figure in accordance with the legal advice from the Attorney-General.

Strong activism by individuals and both Indigenous and non-Indigenous groups greatly aided the success of the 1967 referendum in the years leading up to the vote. Calls for Aboriginal issues to be dealt with at the Federal level began as early as 1910. Despite a failed attempt in the 1944 referendum, minimal changes were instigated for Aboriginal rights until the 1960s, where the Bark Petition in 1963 and the ensuing Milirrpum v Nabalco Pty Ltd and Commonwealth of Australia (Gove Land Rights Case), and Gurindji Strike highlighted the negative treatment of Indigenous workers in the Northern Territory. From here, the overall plight of Aboriginal Australians became a fundamental political issue.

On 7 April 1965, the Menzies Cabinet decided that it would seek to repeal section 127 of the Constitution at the same time as it sought to amend the nexus provision, but made no firm plans or timetable for such action. In August 1965, Attorney-General Billy Snedden proposed to Cabinet that abolition of section 127 was inappropriate unless section 51(xxvi) was simultaneously amended to remove the words "other than the aboriginal race in any state". He was rebuffed, but gained agreement when he made a similar submission to the Holt Cabinet in 1966. In the meantime, his Liberal colleague Billy Wentworth had introduced a private member's bill proposing inter alia to amend section 51(xxvi).

In 1964, the Leader of the Opposition, Arthur Calwell, had proposed such a change and pledged that his party, the Australian Labor Party, would back any referendum to that effect.

In 1967 the Australian Parliament was unanimous in voting for the alteration Bill.

The Australian Board of Missions, the Australasian Association for the Advancement of Science, the Australian Aborigines League, the Australian Council of Churches, the Federal Council for the Advancement of Aborigines and Torres Strait Islanders (FCAATSI), and spokespeople such as Ruby Hammond, Bill Onus and Faith Bandler are just some of the many groups and individuals who effectively utilised the media and their influential platforms to generate the momentum needed to achieve a landslide Yes vote.

Amendments to the Constitution
Voters were asked to approve, together, changes to two provisions in the Constitution section 51(xxvi) and section 127.

Section 51 begins:

And the extraordinary clauses that follow (ordinarily referred to as heads of power) list most of the legislative powers of the federal parliament. The amendment deleted the text in bold from subsection xxvi (known as the "race" or "races" power):

The amendment gave the Commonwealth parliament power to make "special laws" with respect to Aborigines living in a state; the parliament already had unfettered power in regard to territories under section 122 of the Constitution. The intent was that this new power for the Commonwealth would be used only beneficially, though the High Court decision in Kartinyeri v Commonwealth, was that the 1967 amendment did not impose such a restriction and the power could be used to the detriment of an identified race. The Hindmarsh Island bridge controversy, and the Northern Territory Intervention are two circumstances where the post-1967 race power has arguably been used in this way.

Section 127 was wholly removed. Headed "Aborigines not to be counted in reckoning population", it had read:

The Constitution required the calculation of "the people" for several purposes in sections 24, 89, 93 and 105. Section 89 related to the imposition of uniform customs duties and operated until 1901. Section 93 related to uniform custom duties after being imposed by section 89 and operated until 1908. Section 105 related to taking over state debts and was superseded by section 105A inserted in the Constitution in 1929 following the 1928 referendum. Accordingly, in 1967 only section 24 in relation to the House of Representatives had any operational importance to section 127. 

Section 24 "requires the membership of the House of Representatives to be distributed among the States in proportion to the respective numbers of their people". The number of people in section 24 is calculated using the latest statistics of the Commonwealth which are derived from the census. Section 51(xi) of the Constitution enabled the Parliament to make laws for "census and statistics" and it exercised that power to pass the Census and Statistics Act 1905.

What the referendum didn't do

Give voting rights

It is frequently stated that the 1967 referendum gave Aboriginal people Australian citizenship and that it gave them the right to vote in federal elections; however this is not the case. 

From 1944 Aboriginal people in Western Australia could apply to become citizens of the state, which gave them various rights, including the right to vote. This citizenship was conditional on adopting "the manner and habits of civilised life" and not associating with Aboriginal people other than their parents, siblings, children, or grandchildren, and could be taken away at any time. This situation continued until 1971. Most Indigenous Australians continued to be denied the right to vote in elections for the Australian Parliament even after 1949. The Commonwealth Electoral Act 1949 gave Aboriginal people the right to vote in federal elections only if they were able to vote in their state elections (they were disqualified from voting altogether in Queensland, while in Western Australia and in the Northern Territory the right was conditional), or if they had served in the defence force. 

The Commonwealth Electoral Act 1962 gave all Aboriginal people the option of enrolling to vote in federal elections. It was not until the Commonwealth Electoral Amendment Act 1983 that voting became compulsory for Aboriginal people, as it was for other Australians.

Aboriginal people (and all other people) living in the Northern Territory were not allowed to vote in the referendum, which remained the case for both the Northern Territory and the Australian Capital Territory until the Constitutional amendment to section 128 after a referendum in 1977.

Supersede a "Flora and Fauna Act" 

It is also sometimes mistakenly stated that the 1967 referendum overturned a Flora and Fauna Act. This is believed to have come from the New South Wales National Parks and Wildlife Act 1974, which controlled Aboriginal heritage, land, and culture. The other states had equivalent Acts, which were managed by various departments, including those relating to agriculture and fishing.

The right to be included in the census 
Section 127 prevented the inclusion of the Indigenous Australians in the official population for constitutional purposes, i.e. their population would not be included in the calculation of the number of seats to assign for each state or in the determination of tax revenue. The section did not prevent the Bureau of Statistics from counting or collecting other information about Indigenous Australians.

Question

Results

At this time territorians, while able and required to vote in elections, were not permitted to vote in referendums. That was not established until 1977.

Legacy 

Ninety percent of voters voted yes, and the overwhelming support gave the Federal Government a clear mandate to implement policies to benefit Aboriginal people. A lot of misconceptions have arisen as to the outcomes of the referendum, some as a result of it taking on a symbolic meaning during a period of increasing Aboriginal self-confidence. It was some five years before any real change occurred as a result of the referendum, but federal legislation has since been enacted covering land rights, discriminatory practices, financial assistance, and preservation of cultural heritage.

The referendum result had two main outcomes:
 The first was to alter the legal boundaries within which the Federal Government could act. The Federal Parliament was given a constitutional head-of-power under which it could make special laws "for" Aboriginal people (for their benefit or, as has the High Court has made clear, their detriment) in addition to other "races". The Australian Constitution states that federal law prevails over state law, where they are inconsistent, so that the Federal Parliament could, if it so chose, enact legislation that would end discrimination against Aboriginal people by state governments. However, during the first five years following the referendum the Federal Government did not use this new power.
The other key outcome of the referendum was to provide Aboriginal people with a symbol of their political and moral rights. The referendum occurred at a time when Aboriginal activism was accelerating, and it was used as a kind of historical shorthand for all the relevant political events of the time, such as the demands for land rights by the Gurindji people, the equal-pay case for pastoral workers, and the Freedom Rides to end segregation in New South Wales. This use as a symbol for a period of activism and change has contributed to the misconceptions about the effects of the constitutional changes themselves.

Symbolic effect
The 1967 referendum has acquired a symbolic meaning in relation to a period of rapid social change during the 1960s. As a result, it has been credited with initiating political and social change that was the result of other factors. The real legislative and political impact of the 1967 referendum has been to enable, and thereby compel, the federal government to take action in the area of Aboriginal Affairs. Federal governments with a broader national and international agenda have attempted to end the discriminatory practices of state governments such as Queensland and to introduce policies that encourage self-determination and financial security for Aboriginal people. However, the effectiveness of these policies has been tempered by an unwillingness of most federal governments to deal with the difficult issues involved in tackling recalcitrant state governments.

Land rights

The benefits of the referendum began to flow to Aboriginal people in 1972. On 26 January 1972, Aboriginal peoples erected the Aboriginal Tent Embassy on the lawns of the Federal Parliament building in Canberra to express their frustration at the lack of progress on land rights and racial discrimination issues. This became a major confrontation that raised Aboriginal affairs high on the political agenda in the federal election later that year. One week after gaining office, the Whitlam Government (1972–1975) established a Royal Commission into land rights for Aboriginal people in the Northern Territory under Justice Woodward. Its principal recommendations, delivered in May 1974, were: that Aboriginal people should have inalienable title to reserve lands; that regional land councils should be established; to establish a fund to purchase land with which Aboriginal people had a traditional connection, or that would provide economic or other benefits; prospecting and mineral exploration on Aboriginal land should only occur with their consent (or that of the Federal Government if the national interest required it); entry onto Aboriginal land should require a permit issued by the regional land council. The recommendations were framed in terms to enable application outside the Northern Territory. The Federal Government agreed to implement the principal recommendations and in 1975 the House of Representatives passed the Aboriginal Councils and Associations Bill and the Aboriginal Land (Northern Territory) Bill, but the Senate had not considered them by the time parliament was dissolved in 1975.

The following year, the Fraser government (1975–1983) amended the Aboriginal Land (Northern Territory) Bill by introducing the Aboriginal Land Rights (Northern Territory) Bill. The new bill made a number of significant changes such as limitation on the operations and boundaries of land councils; giving Northern Territory law effect on Aboriginal land, thereby enabling land rights to be eroded; removing the power of land councils to issue permits to non-Aboriginal people; and allowing public roads to be built on Aboriginal land without consent. This bill was passed as the Aboriginal Land Rights Act 1976. It is significant however that this legislation was implemented at all, given the political allegiances of the Fraser Government, and shows the level of community support for social justice for Aboriginal people at the time.

Use of "race power" in legislation
The Whitlam Government used its constitutional powers to overrule racially discriminatory state legislation. On reserves in Queensland, Aboriginal people were forbidden to gamble, use foul language, undertake traditional cultural practices, indulge in adultery, or drink alcohol. They were also required to work without payment. In the Aboriginal Courts in Queensland the same official acted as judge as well as the prosecuting counsel. Defendants almost invariably pleaded guilty as pleas of not guilty were more than likely to lead to a longer sentence. The Whitlam Government, using the race power, enacted the Aboriginal and Torres Strait Islanders (Queensland Discriminatory Laws) Act 1975 to override the state laws and eliminate racial discrimination against Aboriginal people. No federal government ever enforced this Act.

The race power was also used by the Whitlam Government to positively discriminate in favour of Aboriginal people. It established schemes whereby Aboriginal people could obtain housing, loans, emergency accommodation and tertiary education allowances. It also increased funding for the Aboriginal Legal Service enabling twenty-five offices to be established throughout Australia.

The race power gained in the 1967 referendum has been used in several other pieces of significant Federal legislation. One of the pieces of legislation enacted to protect the Gordon River catchment used the race power but applied it to all people in Australia. The law prohibited anyone from damaging sites, relics and artefacts of Aboriginal settlement in the Gordon River catchment. In the Tasmanian Dam Case, the High Court held that even though this law applied to all people and not only to Aboriginal people, it still constituted a special law.

In the 1992 Mabo judgement, the High Court of Australia established the existence of Native Title in Australian Common Law. Using the race power, the Keating Government enacted the Native Title Act 1993 and successfully defended a High Court challenge from the Queensland Government.

Negative application of "race power"
When John Howard's Coalition government came to power in 1996, it intervened in the Hindmarsh Island bridge controversy in South Australia with legislation that introduced an exception to the Aboriginal and Torres Strait Islander Heritage Protection Act 1984, to allow the bridge to proceed. The Ngarrindjeri challenged the new legislation in the High Court on the basis that it was discriminatory to declare that the Heritage Protection Act applied to sites everywhere but Hindmarsh Island, and that such discrimination – essentially on the basis of race – had been disallowed since the Commonwealth was granted the power to make laws with respect to the "Aboriginal race" as a result of the 1967 Referendum. The High Court decided, by a majority, that the amended s.51(xxvi) of the Constitution still did not restrict the Commonwealth parliament to making laws solely for the benefit of any particular race, but still empowered the parliament to make laws that were to the detriment of any race. This decision effectively meant that those people who had believed that they were casting a vote against negative discrimination towards Indigenous people in 1967 had, in fact, allowed the Commonwealth to participate in the discrimination against Indigenous people which had been practised by the States.

See also

 Council for Aboriginal Rights
 History of Australia
 Politics of Australia
 Referendums in Australia
 Voting rights of Aboriginal and Torres Strait Islander peoples

Notes

References

Sources

Further reading 

 Includes concise summary of referendum, plus detailed section on Legislative Background, starting with the 1891 National Australasian Convention. Tabs to other pages include a long list of Resources and a guide to sources relating to the movement for constitutional recognition of Indigenous Australians .
 . Contains interviews with Aboriginal campaigners.

 

 
  Discusses the 1967 referendum in the light of the proposed new referendum.

External links
 (Scan of first two pages of information booklet, including the two questions)

1967 referendum: 50 years + counting digitised recording of an event held at State Library of Queensland reflecting on the 50 year anniversary of the referendum 
Don't Just Count Us, Let Us Count!, State Library of Queensland. Exhibition relating to the 1967 Australian Referendum, made in conjunction with the Aboriginal Centre for Performing Arts (ACPA). 

! colspan="3" style="border-top: 5px solid #cccccc" | Amendments to the Constitution of Australia
|-
| style="width: 30%; text-align: center;" | 4th amendmentSocial Services Amendment (1946)

| style="width: 30%; text-align: center;" | Followed bySenate Vacancies AmendmentReferendum amendment(1977)

May 1967 events in Australia
Amendments to the Constitution of Australia
Indigenous Australian politics
1967 referendums
Constitutional referendums in Australia